All of Me is a compilation album by Canadian artist Anne Murray. It was released by Straightway Records on January 25, 2005. The first disc had been released as I'll Be Seeing You in 2004. All of Me peaked at number 13 on the Billboard Top Country Albums chart.

Track listing

Chart performance

References

2005 compilation albums
Anne Murray compilation albums